Varano may refer to:

People
Da Varano, Italian noble family
 Federico Varano (born 1995), Italian footballer
Michele Antonio Varano (born 1951), Italian criminal
Saint Camilla Battista da Varano
Giovanni Maria da Varano, last Varano duke of Camerino

Places
Varano Borghi, comune in Lombardy, Italy
Varano de' Melegari, comune in Emilia-Romagna, Italy
Cagnano Varano, comune in Apulia, Italy
Lago di Varano, lake in Apulia, Italy